Washington Township is an inactive township in Cedar County, in the U.S. state of Missouri.

Washington Township was established in the 1850s, taking its name from President George Washington.

References

Townships in Missouri
Townships in Cedar County, Missouri